The United Rentals 200 is a NASCAR Xfinity Series race held at Phoenix Raceway in Avondale, Arizona.

In 2017, the event was one of the four Xfinity Dash4Cash events, taking Indianapolis Motor Speedway's spot and making the 2017 Dash4Cash events at Phoenix, Bristol, Richmond, and Dover. In 2018, the Dash4Cash event moved to the MoneyLion 300 at Talladega.

Past winners

 2006, 2008, & 2009: Races extended due to NASCAR overtime finishes.
 2014: Race shortened due to rain.

Multiple winners (drivers)

Multiple winners (teams)

Manufacturer wins

References

External links
 

2005 establishments in Arizona
NASCAR Xfinity Series races
 
Recurring sporting events established in 2005
Annual sporting events in the United States